The 1974–75 Serie A season was the 41st season of the Serie A, the top level of ice hockey in Italy. 10 teams participated in the league, and SG Cortina won the championship.

Final round

Placing round

External links
 Season on hockeytime.net

1974–75 in Italian ice hockey
Serie A (ice hockey) seasons
Italy